Royn Hvalba or Bóltfelagið Royn, or just Royn, is a Faroese football and sports association from Hvalba in Suðuroy, founded on 23 October 1923. The chairman for Royn Hvalba is Poul Laust Christiansen. Manager is Brynjar Poulsen. Royn has a team in the Faroese second division (2. deild). Royn also has teams for girls and boys, in 2012 they had a team for girls under 12, a team for boys U8 and one for boys U10. Royn and TB Tvøroyri now have a new manager for all the youth teams of the two clubs. Men over 35 have their own team. The women had their own team earlier. Royn is one of three football associations in the island Suðuroy. The other two football clubs are FC Suðuroy with base in Vágur and TB Tvøroyri from Tvøroyri. Royn Hvalba plays its home matches on the football field in Hvalba, which is the only grass field left in the Faroe Islands (natural grass).

After the end of the 2016 season, it was decided on 15 December 2016 that the three clubs of the island Suðuroy, which are TB Tvøroyri, FC Suðuroy and Royn Hvalba would merge into a new club for the 2017 season. Since then, in 2019 the three clubs, in the island of Suđuroy, have agreed on separating again, only in the men's teams.
 The merger will not be complete until 2018 and the name will be all three names together for the 2017 season: TB/FC Suðuroy/Royn. The three clubs have not been dissolved yet, they continue separately for the children's and women's teams. In 2017, it will only be the men's teams which will play for the new cooperation. In Faroese, the new team is referred to as Suðuroyarliðið (the Suðuroy-team). The first head coach for the Suðuroy-team is Maurice Ross.

The teams have since dissolved. 
Only applying Suðuroyarliðið to the younger teams.

Honours 
1. deild (2nd tier): 1
 1946
2. deild (3rd tier): 3
 1977, 1996, 2003, 2020, 2021
3. deild (4th tier): 2
 2014, 2019, 2022

Current squad 

As of July 12, 2022.

References 

 Goal.sportal.com.au Statistics in English about Royn Hvalba's matches in 2005, when they were in the second best division 1. deild and the results from 2009 and 2010.
 Sudurras1.com Article in Faroese about the Logmansteypid (2010 Faroe Islands Cup) match in the preliminary round between Royn Hvalba and FC Hoyvík in March 2010.
 Youtube.com Sport News from the National Faroese Channel "Kringvarpið", about the "Løgmansteypið 2010 – Preliminary Round" match between Royn Hvalba and FC Hoyvík.
 portal.fo , (google doc), Faroese
 Portal.fo (Google doc)
 B68.fo
 fchoyvik.fo
 vb1905.fo
 07vestur.fo
https://www.faroesoccer.com/team.php?teamID=5762 (Royn Current Squad) Faroese

External links 
 Royn Hvalba's official website
 Hvalba.fo Municipality of Hvalba

Royn Hvalba
Association football clubs established in 1923
1923 establishments in the Faroe Islands